Veronica Serrato is an American immigration lawyer. She is a recipient of the Ohtli Award, the highest award given by the Mexican government to people serving Mexicans abroad.

Education and early life 
Serrato was born in Chicago; her parents immigrated to the US from Moroleon, Guanajuato, Mexico. Serrato attended Harvard University for her undergraduate degree (A.B. in 1984) and Boston University School of Law for her J.D, graduating in 1988. She was the first in her family to attend college.

Career 
Serrato was the founding executive director of Project Citizenship, a non-profit focused on helping legal permanent residents (green card holders) become American citizens. Under her leadership, 8,300 immigrants achieved US citizenship.  According to Congresswoman Katherine Clark (D-MA), it is the largest citizenship provider in New England. They are "unapologetically pro-immigrant."

In 2019, Project Citizenship and Ropes and Gray sued USCIS for their plan to remove fee waivers for the naturalization process.

Prior to Project Citizenship, Serrato served as a Senior Attorney at Volunteer Lawyers Project.  She served as a Clinical Instructor and later, Domestic Violence Specialist, at the Legal Services Center of Harvard Law School, where she handled domestic violence cases.

Awards and honors 

 Ohtli Award, Mexican government, 2018
 Silver Shingle Award, Boston University School of Law, 2017
 Guest of Congresswoman Katherine Clark, State of the Union Address, 2017
Sarah B. Ignatius Award for Excellence in Law, PAIR Project, Boston, June 2020
Spirit of Boston award, Mayor Martin Walsh, November 2019
Massachusetts Association of Hispanic Attorneys, 2019 Organization of the Year Award 
Massachusetts Lawyers Weekly Top Women in the Law Award, October 2014
Boston University School of Law Public Interest Attorney Award, April 13, 2014
 Victor Garo Public Service Award, Boston University School of Law, 2015
 Community Hero, ABCD

References 

Boston University School of Law alumni
Boston University alumni
Lawyers from Chicago
Lawyers from Boston
Harvard University alumni
American nonprofit executives
Year of birth missing (living people)
Living people
Ohtli Award winners